Sizergh Castle and Garden is a stately home and garden at Helsington in the English county of Cumbria, about  south of Kendal. Located in historic Westmorland, the castle is a grade I listed building. While remaining the home of the Hornyold-Strickland family, the castle with its garden and estate is in the care of the National Trust.

In 2016 the Sizergh estate was included in the newly extended Lake District National Park.

Details 

The earliest part of the building is a tower of fourteenth or fifteenth century date.

Woodwork 

Some of the early furnishings date from the time of Walter Strickland (1516–1569) who married Alice Tempest in 1560. She made inventories of the house after her husband's death. These mention three oak armchairs and three chests still in the house.

There are oak-panelled interiors, including the Inlaid Chamber, where the panelling is inlaid with floral and geometric patterns in pale
poplar and dark bog-oak. The contents of the Inlaid Chamber were sold to the Victoria and Albert Museum in the 1890s and it was displayed as a reconstructed period room.
The return of the panelling to its original location at Sizergh was advocated by among others Mark Girouard, an authority on England's country houses. The panelling returned in 1999 under a long-term loan.  In 2017 it was reported that transfer of ownership to the National Trust had been made formal.

The bargeboards probably date from the seventeenth century.

Paintings 
The Castle contains a variety of paintings, including the following:

 a collection of portraits of the Catholic Royal Stuart family reflects the Strickland family's links to the Jacobite court in exile at Saint-Germain-en-Laye. There are portraits by Alexis Simon Belle, painter in ordinary to James VII & II and the Old Pretender, of Queen Mary of Modena and her daughter Princess Louisa Maria.
 Strickland family portraits, including 
works by local artist George Romney, 
a portrait of Mrs Anne Strickland (the artist's mother) by Harriet Strickland (1816–1903), and a portrait of Lady Edeline Sackville.

Portraits gallery

History
The Deincourt family owned this land from the 1170s. On the marriage of Elizabeth Deincourt to Sir William de Stirkeland in 1239, the estate passed into the hands of what became the Strickland family, who owned it until it was gifted to the National Trust in 1950 by Gerald Strickland, 1st Baron Strickland's grandson Lt. Cdr. Thomas Hornyold-Strickland, 7th Count della Catena.

Catherine Parr, the sixth wife of Henry VIII and a relative of the Stricklands, is thought to have lived here after her first husband died in 1533. Catherine's second husband, Lord Latymer, was kin to the dowager Lady Strickland.

It was extended in Elizabethan times. Sir Thomas Strickland went into exile with James II.

Around 1770, the great hall was again expanded in the Georgian style.

Gardens

The gardens are registered Grade II. There is a lake, a kitchen garden and a rock garden. The rock garden, constructed in the 1920s, is the largest limestone rock garden belonging to the National Trust.

Sizergh houses part of the National Collection of ferns, which are to be seen in the rock garden, the stumpery and the orchard.

Estate
In 1336 a grant from Edward III allowed Sir Walter Strickland to enclose the land around Sizergh as his exclusive park.

Biodiversity

There are various types of habitat on the estate. For example, in 2014 it was reported that 35 ha of wetland habitat was being created in the Lyth Valley on the western edge of the estate. The project received funding from Natural England as part of a higher level stewardship scheme. It is hoped to attract bittern and other wildlife.

Sizergh has received support from the Morecambe Bay Nature Improvement Area which was launched in 2012. It received three years of government grant funding (2012–15). Projects continue under the auspices of the Morecambe Bay Partnership, a registered charity.

Birds
The Sizergh estate is a good place to see birds. For example, hawfinches are attracted to the area because of its hornbeam trees, and these birds sometimes come close to the main car park.

Butterflies
Fritillary butterflies (including pearl-bordered and high brown fritillary) live on the estate.

Literary and media interest
The castle was featured in the ITV documentary Inside the National Trust.

The room known as the Inlaid Chamber is the subject of Letitia Elizabeth Landon's poetical illustration The Queen’s Room, Sizergh Hall, Westmorland to an engraving of a painting by Thomas Allom, published in Fisher's Drawing Room Scrap Book, 1836.

See also

 Grade I listed buildings in Cumbria
 Listed buildings in Helsington
 Castles in Great Britain and Ireland
 List of historic houses in England
 Strickland (surname)

References

"Helsington: Sizergh Castle, Sizergh" (2007) 7 Transactions of the Cumberland & Westmorland Antiquarian & Archeological Society (Third Series) 257

External links

Sizergh Castle & Garden information at the National Trust
Sizergh Castle garden
Paintings at Sizergh, Art UK
wikidata List of paintings at Sizergh Castle
Illustrated guide to Sizergh Castle
The Cumbria Directory – Sizergh Castle Garden

Houses completed in the 14th century
Birdwatching sites in England
Towers completed in the 14th century
Castles in Cumbria
Peel towers in Cumbria
Grade II listed parks and gardens in Cumbria
Country houses in Cumbria
National Trust properties in Cumbria
Collections of the Victoria and Albert Museum
Historic house museums in Cumbria
Grade I listed buildings in Cumbria